CNEC Lee I Yao Memorial Secondary School (LIY) is an aided Chinese medium of instruction school founded in 1981 upon the principles of Christian evangelicalism.  Its sponsoring body is the Christian Nationals' Evangelism Commission.

LIY is located in Kwai Shing, within the larger industrial district of Kwai Chung, which is well known for its  busy container terminal.

External links
Official Website 
Hong Kong Education Bureau (EDB) School Lists by district

Protestant secondary schools in Hong Kong